Carrowcastle Wedge Tomb is a wedge-shaped gallery grave and National Monument located in County Mayo, Ireland.

Location

History

This wedge tomb was built , in the Copper or Bronze Age.

Description

The round capstone sits above a small gallery. There is much cairn material and the remains of a mound visible.

References

National Monuments in County Mayo
Archaeological sites in County Mayo